Andrei Evgenyevich Ankudinov (born February 11, 1991) is a Russian ice hockey player. He is currently playing with HC Yugra of the Kontinental Hockey League (KHL).

Ankudinov made his Kontinental Hockey League (KHL) debut playing with HC Spartak Moscow during the 2012–13 KHL season.

References

External links

1991 births
Living people
Russian ice hockey right wingers
HC Spartak Moscow players
Sportspeople from Yekaterinburg